The Pascoe River is a river located in Far North Queensland, Australia.

The headwaters rise under Mount Yangee in the Table Range, part of the Great Dividing Range at the northern end of Cape York Peninsula. The river initially flows south then west past the Sir William Thompson Range then veers north through the mostly uninhabited country. Flowing past Hamilton Hill the river then heads east past Wattle Hill and runs parallel with the Goddard Hills forming the northern border of Kutini-Payamu National Park. The river finally discharges into Weymouth Bay and onto the Coral Sea. From source to mouth, the Pascoe River is joined by eight tributaries including the Little Pascoe River; descending  over its  course.

The traditional owners of the area are the Kuuku Ya’u, Kaanju and Umpila people who maintain a strong spiritual connection to the land.

See also

References

Rivers of Far North Queensland
Bodies of water of the Coral Sea